Red Poppies on Walls is a 1976 Albanian drama film directed by Dhimitër Anagnosti. The film is based on the auto-biographical book by Petraq Qafzezi.

Plot

The film takes place in an orphanage in Tirana, Albania in the beginning of World War II during occupation of the Italian fascists and tells the story of the harsh lives of the orphans living in total oppression and manipulation and uprising against the corrupt school system.

Cast
Strazimir 	
Enea Zeku	
Artur Hoxholli	
Krenar Arifi	
Kadri Roshi
Agim Qirjaqi
Timo Flloko

External links
 

1976 films
1976 drama films
Albanian World War II films
Albanian-language films
Albanian drama films